Sergei Yurevich Shmelyov or Sergei Shmelev ( born August 28, 1993) is a Russian professional ice hockey player currently under contract with Salavat Yulaev Ufa in the Kontinental Hockey League (KHL). He made his KHL debut playing with Atlant Moscow Oblast during the 2012–13 KHL season.

In his fourth season with HC Sochi, Shemlyov led the team in scoring during the 2020–21 season, collecting 21 goals and 43 points in 60 regular season games. As a free agent, Shmelyov was signed to a lucrative one-year contract with Salavat Yulaev Ufa on 6 May 2021.

References

External links

1993 births
Living people
Russian ice hockey left wingers
Atlant Moscow Oblast players
People from Nizhnekamsk
Salavat Yulaev Ufa players
HC Sochi players
HC Spartak Moscow players
Sportspeople from Tatarstan